This is a list of football clubs in Myanmar.

Myanmar National League clubs

Lower Myanmar Division
 Ayeyawady United
 Hanthawady United
 Southern Myanmar United
 Yangon United

Upper Myanmar Division
Magway
 Rakhine United
 Sagaing United
Shan United
Yadanabon
ISPE

Myanmar Premier League clubs

2007-2008 season

 Finance and Revenue
 Kanbawza
 Commerce
 Energy
 Transport
 YCDC
 Construction

 Defence
 A&I
 Home Affairs
 Forestry
 Railways
 Royal Eleven
 Army

References

Myanmar
 
Football clubs
Football clubs